In mathematics, the mean value problem was posed by Stephen Smale in 1981. This problem is still open in full generality. The problem asks:

 For a given complex polynomial  of degree  and a complex number , is there a critical point  of   such that

 

For a polynomial of degree  the constant  has to be at least  from the example , therefore no bound better than  can exist.

Partial results

The conjecture is known to hold in special cases; for other cases, the bound on  could be improved depending on the degree , although no absolute bound  is known that holds for all .

In 1989, Tischler has shown that the conjecture is true for the optimal bound  if  has only real roots, or if all roots of  have the same norm. In 2007, Conte et al. proved that , slightly improving on the bound  for fixed .

Considering the reverse inequality, Dubinin and Sugawa have proven that (under the same conditions as above) there exists a critical point  such that . The problem of optimizing this lower bound is known as the dual mean value problem.

See also
 List of unsolved problems in mathematics

Notes
A.The constraint on the degree is used but not explicitly stated in Smale (1981); it is made explicit for example in Conte (2007). The constraint is necessary. Without it, the conjecture would be false: The polynomial f(z) = z does not have any critical points.

References 

1981 introductions
Complex numbers
Unsolved problems in mathematics
Conjectures